Amphicyoninae is a subfamily of extinct bear-dogs, large terrestrial carnivores belonging to the suborder Caniformia and which inhabited North America, Eurasia, and Africa from ~37.2—2.6 Ma. Amphicyoninae existed for approximately ~.

Amphicyoninae was named by Trouessart (1885). It was assigned to Canidae by Matthew (1902); to Ursidae by Ginsburg (1977); and to Amphicyonidae by Hunt (1998).

Genera include: 
Agnotherium, found in both Europe and N. Africa
Amphicyon, found in both Europe and N. America
Cynelos, synonyms include Absonodaphoenus (from Florida) and Hecubides (from Africa), endemic to N. America
Cynodictis
Ischyrocyon, Hadrocyon is a synonym, endemic to N. America
Goupilictis
Magericyon
Pliocyon, endemic to N. America
Pseudocyon, Amphicyonopsis is a synonym, endemic to Europe and N. America
Ysengrinia, found in both Europe and N. America

Fossil distribution
Specimens have been recovered from: 
Midway Site, Gadsden County, Florida ~18.9—18.8 Ma.
Rabbitt Creek Site, Meagher County, Montana ~21.7—18 Ma.
Grimes Landing Site, King William County, Virginia ~17.6 Ma.
Arrisdrift, Namibia ~23.03—11.6 Ma.
Les Beilleaux, France ~20—16.9 Ma.

References

Bear dogs
Oligocene caniforms
Miocene carnivorans
Zanclean extinctions
Aquitanian first appearances